Connacht GAA (Irish: Cumann Lúthchleas Gael Chonnacht) or formally the Connacht Provincial Council of the Gaelic Athletic Association is the governing body for Gaelic games that are played in the province of Connacht, Ireland. It performs a supervisory and appeal role for the five County Boards within the province (listed below). Anomalously, it also exercises its functions for an additional two county boards that are not located in the province: London and New York. Teams from these administrative areas play in the Connacht Senior Football Championship.

County boards

Galway
Leitrim
Mayo
Roscommon
Sligo

Football

Provincial team
The Connacht provincial football team represents the province of Connacht in Gaelic football. The team competes in the Railway Cup.

Players

Players from the following county teams represent Connacht: Galway, Leitrim, Mayo, Roscommon and Sligo.

Competitions

Inter-county

Club

Hurling

Provincial team
The Connacht provincial hurling team represents the province of Connacht in hurling. The team competes in the Railway Cup.

Players

The Connact provincial team usually consists of 14 or 15 Galway players and perhaps one or two from the other counties.

Competitions

Inter-county

There is currently no Connacht hurling championship but the Connacht GAA board has had Senior and Junior Hurling Championships in the past. The game is very strong in Galway but much weaker in the other four counties of the province.

Club

Grades

Camogie

Gael Linn Cup
The Connacht camogie team won the premier representative competition in the women's team field sport of camogie, the Gael Linn Cup on four occasions in 1973, 1974, 2000 and 2008.

Gael Linn Trophy
The Connacht provincial junior camogie team has won the Gael Linn Trophy on four occasions in 1981, 1995, 2006 and 2009.

External links
Connacht Council website

 
 
 
Provincial councils of the Gaelic Athletic Association
Gaelic